John Arrowsmith (1790–1873) was an English cartographer. He was born at Winston, County Durham, England.  He was the nephew of Aaron Arrowsmith, another English cartographer.

In 1810 he joined his uncle in the cartography business. They built on Aaron's A map exhibiting all the new discoveries in the interior parts of North America 1811 version which was heavily based on information provided by the Hudson's Bay Company, Indian maps, and British Navy sea charts to produce and publish an updated map: North America in 1821. Their contributions to Canadian cartography led to Mount Arrowsmith, situated east of Port Alberni on Vancouver Island, British Columbia, being named for them.

Aaron's sons Aaron Jr. and Samuel were substantially younger than John but inherited their father's business when they were young men (21 and 18 respectively) when Aaron Sr. died in 1823. John took the £200 left to him by his uncle and began working on his own. Aaron Jr and Samuel did not have the skills of their father and cousin and their contributions to cartography were minimal. Regardless, the three Arrowsmiths were founding members of the Geographical Society of London in 1830. Aaron Jr. left the family firm in 1832, and upon the death of Samuel in 1839, John purchased the assets and merged them into his own business.

The Arrowsmith River in Western Australia was named by Sir George Grey after Arrowsmith, who later produced the maps for the published journals of Grey's two Western Australian expeditions. In 1863 he received the gold medal of the Royal Geographical Society, which was what the Geographical Society of London was known as after gaining the patronage of King William IV.

He died at home in Hereford Square, South Kensington, London on 1 May 1873.

London Atlas of Universal Geography

Arrowsmith spent the years after his uncle's death preparing maps for his iconic London Atlas of Universal Geography, the first edition of which was published in 1834 with 50 maps. He likely planned to publish it in 1832, many of the maps within it have an 1832 publication year (subsequent editions have several maps within them that have earlier publication years than that of the atlas itself; Arrowsmith did not change the dates on the maps unless and until he updated them). He added and removed maps to the subsequent editions until there were 72 plates in one late edition.  The atlas continued to be published after his death, the rights to publish the maps being acquired by Edward Stanford in 1874.

First edition (1834) of the London Atlas of Universal Geography (50 maps)

The 40 maps include the following (not a complete list; these maps were found in the David Rumsey map collection as included in Arrowsmith's 1838 Atlas. The Rumsey collection has digitized the maps in the 1838 and 1844 edition of the Atlas.  Other editions of the atlas were published in 1834, 1835, 1839, 1840, 1842, 1859 and 1861.) :

Orbis Veteribus Notus (Europe/Asia/Africa)
World, Mercators projection
Europe
England
Ireland
Sweden & Norway
Denmark (with Iceland)
Belgium & Holland
Western Germany
Russia & Poland
Austrian Empire
Switzerland & the Passes of the Alps
South Italy
Turkey in Europe
Greece & the Ionian Islands
Spain & Portugal
Nubia, Abyssinia
Egypt
Asia
Turkey in Asia
India
Burmah, Siam, Cochin China
China
North Asia
Asiatic Archipelago
Pacific Ocean
Mexico
West Indies &
Brazil
British North America

Second edition (1835) of the London Atlas of Universal Geography (50 maps)

In addition to the maps published in 1832 in the above list, the 1835 atlas included the following (not a complete list):

Map with 1833 date:

Discoveries in Western Australia

1834 Maps

Inland navigation, rail roads, geology, minerals of England & Wales
Scotland
France
Prussia & Poland
North Italy, Alps, Apennines
Africa
Northwest Africa
Central Asia
Map of the discoveries in Australia
Van Diemens Land
United States
South America
Columbia
Peru & Bolivia
United Provinces of La Plata, Banda Oriental, Chile

Third edition (1838) of the London Atlas of Universal Geography (50-54 maps)

The first 1838 edition of the Atlas has the same maps as the 1835 edition, except for these maps that had been updated:

America (1835)
Cape of Good Hope (1835)
Map of British North America (1837)
Upper Canada (1837)
Lower Canada (1837)

Later 1838 editions of the atlas than the one in the Rumsey collection replaced the following maps:

Discoveries in Western Australia
Discoveries in Australia

with

The Colony of Western Australia
The south eastern portion of Australia

and added the following maps:

Sketch of the Acquisitions of Russia since the Accession of Peter 1st. to the Throne
Australia from surveys made by order of the British Government 
Eastern portion of Australia
Maritime portion of South Australia

1840 edition of the London Atlas of Universal Geography (62 maps)

The 1840 edition of the Atlas (in the Library of Congress) had the same 54 maps as the 1838 edition, with the addition of the following maps:

Cockburn Sound by J.S. Roe
Map *District of Adelaide, South Australia
Eastern townships of Lower Canada
Western townships of Lower Canada with inset of Quebec
Map of Jamaica
Map of The Leeward Islands
Map of the Windward Islands
Map of British Guiana

1844 edition of the London Atlas of Universal Geography (65 maps) 

The 1844 edition of the Atlas (also in the Rumsey collection) had 58 maps of the 1840 edition, excluding the following:

Cockburn Sound by J.S. Roe
District of Adelaide, South Australia
Eastern townships of Lower Canada
Western townships of Lower Canada with inset of Quebec

with the addition of the following maps:

The West Coast of Africa
The River Niger
Map of Asia Minor
The Caspian Sea
Map of Texas
New Zealand
The Ionian Islands and Malta

Later maps

1848: Southern Tip of Vancouver Island and Oregon Territory
1849: Vancouver Island and the Adjacent Coasts
1850: Southern Tip of Vancouver Island
1850: Asia Trade Routes
1856: Vancouver Island
1857: South Africa - Showing the Routes of the Rev'd Dr. Livingstone between the years 1849 & 1857
1865: South Eastern Africa - Map of the River Shire, the Lakes Nyassa & Shirwa, the Lower Courses of the Rivers Zambesi, & Rovuma

References

English geographers
English cartographers
1780 births
1873 deaths
Map publishing companies
19th-century cartographers
19th-century English people